HMS Nottingham was a 60-gun fourth-rate ship of the line of the Royal Navy, built at Deptford Dockyard and launched on 10 June 1703. She was the first ship to bear the name.

Commissioned under Captain Samuel Whitaker, she formed part of Admiral Cloudesley Shovell's fleet that sailed with Admiral Rooke to attack and take the formidable Rock of Gibraltar in 1704. The ship also saw action in the Battle of Cabrita point in March 1705 and in the Mediterranean in 1711.

Nottingham was rebuilt according to the 1706 Establishment at Deptford, from where she was relaunched on 5 October 1719. On 18 May 1739, orders were issued directing that Nottingham be taken to pieces and rebuilt according to the 1733 proposals of the 1719 Establishment at Sheerness, from where she was relaunched on 17 August 1745.

The ship, when captained by Philip Saumarez, also attacked and captured the French ship , which was returning to France after the failed Duc d'Anville Expedition, 11 October 1746. Nottingham took Augustin de Boschenry de Drucour captive.

Nottingham gained more success with the capture of the French 74-gun  on 31 January 1748 under Captain Robert Harland.

Nottingham continued in service until 1773, when she was sunk to form part of a breakwater.

Notes

References

 Lavery, Brian (2003) The Ship of the Line - Volume 1: The development of the battlefleet 1650-1850. Conway Maritime Press. .

External links
 

Ships of the line of the Royal Navy
1700s ships
Ships sunk as breakwaters